Hyperbolic is an adjective describing something that resembles or pertains to a hyperbola (a curve), to hyperbole (an overstatement or exaggeration), or to hyperbolic geometry.

The following phenomena are described as hyperbolic because they manifest hyperbolas, not because something about them is exaggerated.

 Hyperbolic angle, an unbounded variable referring to a hyperbola instead of a circle
 Hyperbolic coordinates, location by geometric mean and hyperbolic angle in quadrant I

Hyperbolic distribution, a probability distribution characterized by the logarithm of the probability density function being a hyperbola
 Hyperbolic equilibrium point, a fixed point that does not have any center manifolds
 Hyperbolic function, an analog of an ordinary trigonometric or circular function
 Hyperbolic geometric graph, a random network generated by connecting nearby points sprinkled in a hyperbolic space
 Hyperbolic geometry, a non-Euclidean geometry
 Hyperbolic group, a finitely generated group equipped with a word metric satisfying certain properties characteristic of hyperbolic geometry
 Hyperbolic growth, growth of a quantity toward a finite-time singularity
 Hyperbolic logarithm, original designation of natural logarithm (1647–1748) before Euler's formulation with e
 Hyperbolic manifold, a complete Riemannian n-manifold of constant sectional curvature −1
 Hyperbolic motion, an isometry in a hyperbolic space
 Hyperbolic navigation, a class of radio navigation systems based on the difference in timing between the reception of two signals, without reference to a common clock
 Hyperbolic number, a synonym for split-complex number 
 Hyperbolic orthogonality, an orthogonality found in pseudo-Euclidean space
 Hyperbolic paraboloid, a doubly ruled surface shaped like a saddle
 Hyperbolic partial differential equation, a partial differential equation (PDE) of order n that has a well-posed initial value problem for the first n−1 derivatives
 Hyperbolic plane can refer to:
 The 2-dimensional plane in hyperbolic geometry (a non-Euclidean geometry)
 The hyperbolic plane as isotropic quadratic form
 Hyperbolic quaternions, a non-associative algebra, precursor to Minkowski space
 Hyperbolic rotation, a synonym for squeeze mapping
 Hyperbolic sector, a planar region demarcated by radial lines and a hyperbola
 Hyperbolic soccerball, a tessellation of the hyperbolic plane
 Hyperbolic space, hyperbolic spatial geometry in which every point is a saddle point
 Hyperbolic trajectory, a Kepler orbit with eccentricity greater than 1
 Hyperbolic versor, a versor parameterized by a hyperbolic angle
 Hyperbolic unit, a non-real quantity with square equal to +1

See also
 Exaggeration
 Hyperboloid
 Hyperboloid structure